Anti-Jewish violence in Poland from 1944 to 1946 preceded and followed the end of World War II in Europe and influenced the postwar history of the Jews as well as Polish-Jewish relations. It occurred amid a period of violence and anarchy across the country, caused by lawlessness and anti-communist resistance against the Soviet-backed communist takeover of Poland. The estimated number of Jewish victims varies and ranges up to 2,000. In 2021, Julian Kwiek published the first scientific register of incidents and victims of anti-Jewish violence in Poland in 1944-1947, according to his calculations, the number of victims was at least 1,074 to 1,121. Jews constituted between 2% and 3% of the total number of victims of postwar violence in the country, including the Polish Jews who managed to escape the Holocaust on territories of Poland annexed by the Soviet Union, and returned after the border changes imposed by the Allies at the Yalta Conference. The incidents ranged from individual attacks to pogroms.

Jewish emigration from Poland surged partly as a result of this violence, but also because Poland was the only Eastern Bloc country to allow free Jewish emigration (aliyah) to Mandatory Palestine. By contrast, the Soviet Union brought Soviet Jews from DP camps back to the USSR by force irrespective of their choice. Uninterrupted traffic across the Polish borders intensified with many Jews passing through on their way west or south. In January 1946, there were 86,000 survivors registered with the Central Committee of Polish Jews (CKŻP). By the end of summer, the number had risen to about 205,000–210,000 (with 240,000 registrations and over 30,000 duplicates). About 180,000 Jewish refugees came from the Soviet Union after the repatriation agreement. Most left without visas or exit permits thanks to a decree of General Marian Spychalski. By the spring of 1947 only 90,000 Jews resided in Poland.

The violence and its causes have been highly politicized. Polish historian Lukasz Krzyzanowski states that both the attribution of antisemitic motives to all attackers, or on the other hand ascribing all anti-Jewish violence to ordinary criminality, are reductionist; however, in many cases "the Jewishness of the victims was unquestionably the chief, if not the sole, motive for the crime". Tens of thousands of people were killed in Poland's two-year civil war, but also due to indiscriminate postwar lawlessness and abject poverty. Among the Jewish victims were functionaries of the new Stalinist regime, assassinated by the so-called cursed soldiers of the anti-communist underground due to their political loyalties. However, their percentage was not large, among the victims recorded by Julian Kwiek were only 84 people identified with the new government. Jan T. Gross noted that "only a fraction of [the Jewish] deaths could be attributed to antisemitism" and that anti-Jewish violence caused panic among Jews not so much because of its intensity and spread, but rather because of the "atmosphere of widespread anti-Semitism" they experienced after the end of the war. The resentment towards returning Jews among some local Poles included concerns that they would reclaim their property.

Background

Property claims and restitution
A restitution law "On Abandoned Real Estates" of May 6, 1945 allowed property owners who had been dispossessed, or their relatives and heirs, whether residing in Poland or outside the country, to reclaim privately owned property under a simplified inheritance procedure. The law remained in effect until the end of 1948. An expedited court process with minimal costs was put in place to handle claims. Applications had to be examined within 21 days, and many claims were processed the day they were filed.
The Communist government enacted legislation on "abandoned property", placing severe limitations on inheritance not present in pre-war inheritance law which allowed inheritance by second-degree relatives, limiting restitution to the original owners or direct heirs. The initial 1945 decrees were superseded by a 1946 law, with a claims deadline of 31 December 1947 (later extended to 31 December 1948) after which property devolved to the Polish state. Even if Jews regained de jure control, when it was occupied by Poles additional lengthy proceedings were required. The majority of Jewish claimants could not afford the restitution process without financial help due to the filing costs, legal fees, and inheritance tax.

Vast quantities of Jewish property were unclaimed because some Jews being murdered when they sought to reclaim family property and because most Jews left postwar Poland. The murders, variously estimated, intimidated Jews from filing claims. Unclaimed Jewish property devolved to the Polish state on 31 December 1948, but many Jews who had fled to the Soviet Union were not repatriated until after that date. Polish legislation in 1947 severely restricted intestate succession, limiting inheritance by distant family members. Jews who returned to Poland from the Soviet Union and settled in the territories Poland acquired from Germany were entitled to material compensation on equal footing with ethnic Poles who were displaced from Eastern Poland.  While it is hard to estimate how many Jews got property back, they were likely few.

Holocaust survivors and returnees
Polish Jewish survivors of the Nazi Holocaust returning home were confronted with fears of being physically assaulted, robbed and even murdered by certain elements in the society. The situation was further complicated by the fact that there were more Jewish survivors returning from the Soviet Union than those who managed to survive in occupied Poland, thus leading to stereotypes holding Jews responsible for the imposition of totalitarian regime in Stalinist Poland.

Members of the former Communist Party of Poland (KPP) were returning home from the Soviet Union as prominent functionaries of the new regime. Among them was a highly visible number of Poles of Jewish origin, who became active in the Polish Workers' Party/Polish United Workers' Party and the Ministry of Public Security of Poland, among them Hilary Minc, the third in command in Bolesław Bierut's political apparatus and Jakub Berman, head of State Security Services (UB, Urząd Bezpieczeństwa) considered Joseph Stalin's right hand in Poland between 1944 and 1953. Jewish representation in Bolesław Bierut's apparatus of political oppression was considerably higher than their share in the general Polish population. The hypothesis emerged that Stalin had intentionally employed some of them in positions of repressive authority (see Gen. Roman Romkowski, director of the Special Bureau Anatol Fejgin and others) in order to put Poles and Jews "on a collision course." A study by the Polish Institute of National Remembrance showed that between 1944 and 1954 out of 450 people in director positions in the Ministry, 37.1% (or 167) were Jewish. The underground anti-communist press held them responsible for the murder of Polish opponents of the new regime.

Anti-communist armed resistance

As the victory over Nazi Germany was celebrated in the West, in May 1945, Polish partisans attacked country offices of the PUBP, MO (communist state police), UB and NKVD employing numerous Jewish functionaries. Up to 80% of the officers, and 50% of the militiamen in Lublin alone, as well as, up to 75% of the officers in Silesia were Jewish. According to Eisenstein's estimates, 90% of the Jewish functionaries at the state security office in Katowice changed their names to Polish ones after November 10, 1945 for anonymity sake.
In May 1945, public security offices were destroyed by the anti-communist underground in Krasnosielc and Annówka (May 1), Kuryłówka (May 7), Grajewo and Białystok (May 9), Siemiatycze and Wyrzyki (May 11), Ostrołęka and Rembertów (May 18–21), Biała Podlaska (May 21, May 24), Majdan-Topiło (Białowieża Forest, May 28), Kotki (Busko-Zdrój) (May 28). Political prisoners were freed – sometimes up to several hundred or more (see, e.g. the attack on Rembertów) – many of whom were later recaptured and murdered. The human rights law violations and the abuse of power by the Ministry only strengthened the anti-Jewish sentiments in Poland, adding to the  "Żydokomuna" stereotype among ordinary Poles who in general had anti-Communist and anti-Soviet attitudes. Accusations that Jews were being supportive of the new communist regime, and constituted a threat to Poland, came also from some high officials of the Roman Catholic Church.

The provisions of the Yalta agreement allowed Stalin to forcibly return Jewish refugees along with all Soviet nationals from DP camps back to the USSR "irrespective of their personal wishes". The former Polish citizens, the second-largest refugee group in the West, did not even began to return until late 1946. Polish–Jewish DPs (25 percent of their grand total in the beginning of 1947) were declared nonrepatriable – due in part to the US pressure – which forced the British government to open the borders of Palestine. By the spring of 1947 the number of Jews in Poland – in large part arriving from the Soviet Union – declined from 240,000 to 90,000 due to mass migration and the post-Holocaust absence of Jewish life in Poland. "The flight" (Berihah) of Jews was motivated by the raging civil war on Polish lands, in as much as the efforts of a strong Polish-Jewish lobby at the Jewish Agency working towards a higher standard of living and special privileges for the immigrants from Poland. Yitzhak Raphael, director of the Immigration Department – who lobbied on behalf of Polish refugees – insisted on their preferential treatment in Israel.

Reports of political repressions by the Communist forces in Poland and the wave of political murders by the security forces under Soviet control were mounting. The United States ambassador to Poland, Arthur Bliss Lane, was troubled by the mass arrests of Polish non-Communists, and their terrorization by the security police. The wave of state-sponsored terror and large-scale deportations was followed by the nationalization decree of January 1946. In response to his protests, Bierut told Lane to "mind his own business."

Blood libel
The prewar class of Polish intelligentsia ceased to exist. In the country of 23.7 million people in 1946, there were only 40,000 university graduates who survived the war; less than 0.2 percent of the general population. Between 1944 and 1956 some 350,000–400,000 Poles were held in Stalinist prisons. Sporadic anti-Jewish disturbances or riots were enticed by the spread of false blood libel accusations against some Jews in Polish towns – Kraków, Kielce, Bytom, Białystok, Bielawa, Częstochowa, Legnica, Otwock, Rzeszów, Sosnowiec, Szczecin, Tarnów. Acts of anti-Jewish violence were also recorded in villages and small towns of central Poland, where the overwhelming majority of attacks occurred. According to Szaynok, the perpetrators of the anti-Jewish actions were seldom punished.

The Kraków pogrom of August 11, 1945, was the first anti-Jewish riot in postwar Poland, resulting in the shooting death of one woman, Róża Berger, who was hiding from the security forces behind closed doors. A single shot was fired at a locking mechanism which shattered, piercing her body. The immediate cause for the disturbance was a rumour spread by a young hooligan (who later claimed to have been tricked into it) that the corpses of Christian children were hidden at the Kupa Synagogue. During the riot, Jews were attacked in Kazimierz, and other parts of the Old Town. A fire was set in Kupa Synagogue. In total, 145 suspects were arrested including 40 militiamen and 6 soldiers of the WP. In September and October 1945 some 25 of them were charged and 10 of them were sentenced to prison. Shortly after the Kielce pogrom, violence against Jews in Poland had ceased entirely.

Kielce pogrom

A pogrom (the causes of which are still very controversial), erupted in Kielce on July 4, 1946. The rumour that a Polish boy had been kidnapped by Jews but had managed to escape, and that other Polish children had been ritually murdered by Jews – according to Pynsent – ignited a violent public reaction directed at the Jewish Center. Attacks on Jewish residents of Kielce were provoked by units of the communist militia and the Soviet-controlled Polish Army who confirmed the rumors of the kidnapping. Police and soldiers were also the first to fire shots at Jews, according to Szaynok.

The pogrom in Kielce resulted in 42 people being murdered and about 50 seriously injured, yet the number of victims does not reflect the impact of the atrocities committed. The Kielce pogrom was a turning point for the postwar history of Polish Jews according to Michael R. Marrus, as the Zionist underground concluded that there was no future for Jews in Europe. Soon after, Gen. Spychalski signed a decree allowing Jews to leave Poland without visas or exit permits, and the Jewish emigration from Poland increased dramatically. In July 1946, almost 20,000 Jews left Poland. By September, there were approximately 12,000 Jews left. Britain demanded that Poland (among others) halt the Jewish exodus, but their pressure was largely unsuccessful.

Number of victims

A statistical compendium of "Jewish deaths by violence for which specific record is extant, by month and province" was compiled by Engel for the Yad Vashem Shoah Resource Center's International School for Holocaust Studies. The study used as a starting point a 1973 report by historian Lucjan Dobroszycki, who wrote that he had "analyzed records, reports, cables, protocols and press-cuttings of the period pertaining to anti-Jewish assaults and murders in 115 localities" in which approximately 300 Jewish deaths had been documented.

A number of historians, including Antony Polonsky and Jan T. Gross cite the figures originating from Dobroszycki's 1973 work. Dobroszycki wrote that "according to general estimates 1,500 Jews lost their lives in Poland from liberation until the summer of 1947", although historian Jan Gross who cited Dobroszycki claimed that only a fraction of these deaths can be attributed to antisemitism and that most were due to general postwar disorder, political violence and banditry. David Engel wrote that Dobroszycki "offered no reference for such 'general estimates'" which "have not been confirmed by any other investigator" and "no proof-text for this figure" exists, not even a smaller one of 1,000 claimed by Gutman. According to Engel, "both estimates seem high." Other estimates include those of Anna Cichopek claiming more than 1,000 Jews murdered in Poland between 1944 and 1947. According to Stefan Grajek around 1,000 Jews died in the first half of year 1946. Historian Tadeusz Piotrowski estimated that between 1944 and 1947 there were 1,500–2,000 Jewish victims of general civil strife that came about with Soviet consolidation of power, constituting 2 to 3 percent of the total number of victims of postwar violence in the country. 

According to a 2021 book by Julian Kwiek, at least from 1,074 to 1,121 Jews died as a result of individual and collective violence between 1944 and 1947. Murders took place in at least 365 localities, in the vast majority of cases targeted defenseless people, including women and children, and originated from a climate of indifference, aversion and hostility towards the Jews on the part of the local population.

In the Yad Vashem Studies paper, Holocaust historian David Engel wrote:

Studying case records, Engel wrote that the compilation of cases is not exhaustive, suggesting that cases of anti-Jewish violence were selectively reported and recorded, and that there was no centralized, systematic effort to record these cases. He cites numerous incidental reports of killings of Jews for which no official reporting has survived. He concludes that these figures have "obvious weaknesses" and that the detailed records used to compile them are clearly deficient and lacking data from the Białystok region. For example, Engel cites one source that shows a total of 108 Jewish deaths during March 1945 and another source that shows 351 deaths between November 1944 and December 1945.

See also
 Neighbors: The Destruction of the Jewish Community in Jedwabne, Poland
 National Armed Forces

References

Bibliography 

 

1940s in Poland
Blood libel
Jewish Polish history
Aftermath of World War II in Poland
World War II crimes in Poland
Aftermath of the Holocaust
Riots and civil disorder in Poland
1944 riots
1945 riots
1946 riots
Anti-Jewish violence in Central and Eastern Europe, 1944–1946
Antisemitism in Poland